Hokkey Kazakhstana is a Kazakh sports magazine specializing in ice hockey. Its chief editor is Maksim Kartashov.

References

External links

Kazakhstani sport websites
Ice hockey in Kazakhstan